The 2018 Pac-12 Conference women's basketball tournament presented by New York Life was the postseason tournament that ended the 2017–18 season of the Pac-12 Conference. The tournament was held at KeyArena in Seattle, Washington from March 1–4, 2018. Regular-season champion Oregon won the tournament and with it the automatic Pac-12 berth in the NCAA tournament.

Seeds
Teams were seeded by conference record, with ties broken in the following order:
 Record between the tied teams
 Record against the highest-seeded team not involved in the tie, going down through the seedings as necessary
 Higher RPI

Schedule

Thursday-Sunday, March 1–4, 2017

The top four seeds received a first-round bye.

Bracket
 All times are Pacific

All-Tournament Team
Source:

Most Outstanding Player

See also

 2018 Pac-12 Conference men's basketball tournament

References

Tournament
Pac-12 Conference women's basketball tournament
Basketball competitions in Seattle
Pac 12 Tournament
Women's sports in Washington (state)
College basketball tournaments in Washington (state)